Judy Blum may refer to:

 Judy Blume (born 1938), American children's author
 Judy Sheindlin (born 1942 as Judy Blum), American television judge known as Judge Judy